Mundeyan Ton Bachke Rahin (English: Beware of Boys) is a Punjabi romantic comedy film starring Roshan Prince, Jassi Gill, Simran Kaur Mundi, Sunny Gill, Bharti Singh and Anshu (Preeto) Sawhney.

Plot
The film is romance comedy about two best friends, Roshan Prince & Jassi Gill who got their hearts broken at the age of 13 in school and then vow to never fall in love again but instead make girls fall in love with them and break their hearts, however now 10 years later they both end up meeting the same girl Simran Kaur Mundi and compete to see who can make her fall in love with them, whoever gets her wins their game but instead both of them fall madly in love with her and then everything changes.

Cast
 Roshan Prince
 Jassi Gill
 Simran Kaur Mundi 
 Sunny Gill
 Bharti Singh
 Harleen Sethi
 Anshu (Preeto) Sawhney
 Minto
 Hobby Dhaliwal
 Sunita Dhir
 Manoj Sabharwal

Production
The title of the film is inspired by the Panjabi MC song Mundian To Bach Ke Rahi. Shooting for the film took place in November and December 2013 in Nalagarh and Chandigarh. The films trailer along with the first look posters were launched on April 15, 2014 at a first of its kind media event for a Punjabi film and the film released on 30 May 2014 receiving three star review ratings, the tribune said "the film has everything different on platter...and will be known for its unconventional climax, it's something unheard of or unseen in Punjabi films."

Music

Track listing

Awards

The film was nominated for 5 PTC Punjabi Film Awards 2015 and went on to win for Best Lyrics.

Nominated 
Best Actress - Simran Kaur Mundi
Best Debut Director - Navinderpal Singh
Best Music Director - Jassi Katyal / Gurmeet Singh
Best Playback Singer (Male) - Roshan Prince for Suraj

Won
Best Lyricist - Kumaar for Suraj

References

External links
 Mundeyan Ton Bachke Rahin Official Page at Facebook
 
 Mundeyan Ton Bachke Rahin Official Handle on Twitter

2014 films
Punjabi-language Indian films
2010s Punjabi-language films
Films scored by Jassi Katyal